Tony Sheridan (1940–2013) was a musician.

Tony Sheridan may also refer to:

Tony Sheridan (footballer)
Tony Sheridan, on the List of mayors of Wyong Shire